Morten Rask Hampenberg (born 14 January 1977) is a Danish music producer known for both his solo work and his cooperation with the musician Alexander Brown. In his early solo career, he only used his family name and was therefore known as Hampenberg until 2008. In 2009 he began using his full name both in his solo work and joint releases with Brown. He has also used the alias Moám, under which he co-produced Example's UK #2 hit "Say Nothing" and remixed "Stay Awake" and "Watch the Sun Come Up".

Hampenberg collaborates with Brown as Morten Hampenberg & Alexander Brown, a duo releasing joint singles. Some recordings have been collaborations with other artists, including Yepha, Stine Bramsen, Casper Christensen, and Nabiha. The group gained international fame with "Raise the Roof" featuring Fatman Scoop, Pitbull and Nabiha.

Discography

Albums

Singles

Songwriting
2011: "Take Our Hearts" for Jesper Nohrstedt at the 2012 Dansk Melodi Grand Prix

See also
Morten Hampenberg & Alexander Brown

References

Danish record producers
1977 births
Living people